Hiroshima Tōshō-gū (広島東照宮) is a Shinto shrine in Hiroshima, Hiroshima Prefecture, Japan. It enshrines the first Shōgun of the Tokugawa Shogunate, Tokugawa Ieyasu. It was established in 1648.

See also 
Tōshō-gū
List of Tōshō-gū

External links 
Official website

1648 establishments in Japan
Shinto shrines in Hiroshima Prefecture
Tōshō-gū